Lampridius may refer to:

 Aelius Lampridius, one of the six Scriptores in Augustan History
 Lampridius (archbishop), consecrator of Church of St. Chrysogonus